Tudd Thomas Sanga (born 24 September 1981), popularly known by his career name Tudd Thomas, is a Tanzanian music producer, sound engineer, singer and songwriter. He has been a producer for Tanzania House of Talents (THT) for more than four years.

Portfolio

Produced songs 

  RichMavoko – Ibaki Story. 
  Madee- MiguluPande.
  Diamond Platnumz and AKA - Make me Sing.
  All Star- A.C.T wazalendo.
  Diamond Platnumz- Utanipenda.
  Ruby - Forever.
  Shetta feat Kcee- Shikorobo.
  Linex feat Diamond Platnumz – Salima.
  Joketi feat Ice Prince - Leo
  JulioBatalia Feat Chege - Special for you.
  Diamond Platnumz - Nasemanawe
  Victoria Kimani feat Diamond Platnumz &OmmyDimpoz – Prokoto
  Diamond Platnumz feat Iyanya - Bam bam.
  Diamond Platnumz -Mdogomdogo. 
  Ommy Dimpoz – Ndagushima.
  Ruby -Na Yule.
  Chegge feat Malaika – Uswazi Take away.
  Diamond Platnumz -Uswazi Take away remix
  KigomaAll stars- Lekadutigite.
  Mwasiti - Selebuka.
  Barnaba – Jasho la Mnyonge.
  Tanzania All stars - Mboni Yangu.
  Kigoma All Stars - Nyumbani
  Barnaba -Magubegube.
  Ally Nipishe- Ntalila.
  Marlaw - Bembeleza.
  Marlaw – Bembeleza Remix.
  Mwasiti - KisaPombe.
  Rachel – Kizunguzungu.
  Barnaba- Usiendembali.
  Amini- Unikimbie
  Linah – Fitina
  Lameck Ditto- Tushukurukwayote.
  Linex – Mama Halima.
  Mwasiti - Soldier.
  T.M.K – Tunafurahi.
  Darassa Feat Lameck Ditto – Weka Ngoma.
  Marlaw- Mbayuwayu.
  Barnaba- MileleDaima.
  Marlaw- Sorry Sana.
  Barnaba- Tulizana
  Barnaba – Tulizana remix.
  Linah Feat Diamond Platnumz - Kizaizai.
  Tazneem - Kwasakwasa.
  Samantha- BiringeBiringe.
  Mapacha - Time for the money
  U.V.C - Kaka yupo town.
  Marlaw - Bidii.
  Linex – Nimetoahela.
  Soggy Feat Ally Kiba, Ibra and Beka- Kizaizai.
  Marlaw – Piipii (I missing my baby).
  Beka feat Barnaba and Amini- Natumaini.
  Barnaba and Amini- Nia Yangu.
  Mwasiti – kisima.
  Makomando- Simama.
  Bandago- Aiyaaa.
  Tzall stars – tokomezaziro.
  QJ&Makamua Feat Joslin – Sifai Remix.
  AT feat Aisha Mashauzi& Joti
  Stara Thomas feat Linex – Shamba.

Featured songs
  Barnaba - Lover Boy
  Diamond Platnumz feat Rayvanny - Salome
  Izo Business - Liz one.
  Diamond Platnumz - Number One Remix.
  Diamond Platnumz -  Ntampatawapi .
  Diamond Platnumz –Nana feat MrFlavour.
  NeywaMitego - Akadumba.
  Linex – WemakwaUbaya.
  Ommy Dimpoz feat Vanesa Mdee – Me and U.
  Harmonize – Aiyola.
  Chiddy Benzi Feat Diamond Platnumz and AY- Kuchee.
  Blacket feat Diamond Platnumz & Tiwa savage – Alive
  Kcee Feat Diamond Platnumz – Love Boat.
  Rachel- Upepo.
  Belle9 feat Izzo, Jux, G nako, Mr blue & Maua – Burger movie selfie remix.
  NuhMziwanda – Oteanani.
  NuhMziwanda – Bilima.
  Alikiba – Hadithi.
  Alikiba - Msiniseme.

Awards and nominations
Tudd Thomas has been nominated in 2015 Tanzania Music Awards as best music producer of the year in Tanzania, and rAll Africa Music Awads AFRIMA 2015 as a best producer in Africa.

Kili Tanzania Music Awards (KTMA)

All Africa Music Awads (AFRIMA)

African Muzik Magazine Awards (AFRIMMA)

Humanitarian African Prestigious Awards (HAPA)

Song awards and nominations
He produced a lot of songs which have been awarded and nominated to different awards.
 
Chaguo la Teneez Music Awards

Nigeria Sound City Music Awards 

Tanzania Music Awards

All Africa Music Awards "AFRIMA" 

International Reggae and World Music Awards "IRAWMA"

References

External links 
 

Living people
1983 births
Tanzanian musicians
Record producers
People from Iringa Region